Eos is the eleventh album by Norwegian jazz guitarist Terje Rypdal recorded in 1983 and released on the ECM label.

Reception
The Allmusic review by Michael P. Dawson awarded the album 2½ stars stating "Probably Rypdal's most experimental release, it's a set of heavily electronic duets with cellist David Darling".

Track listing
All compositions by Terje Rypdal except as indicated
 "Laser" - 4:08   
 "Eos" - 14:35   
 "Bedtime Story" - 5:58   
 "Light Years" (David Darling) - 4:48   
 "Melody" - 2:17   
 "Mirage" - 9:13   
 "Adagietto" - 5:06   
Recorded at Talent Studio in Oslo, Norway in May 1983

Personnel
Terje Rypdal — electric guitar, keyboards (specified on liner notes as Casio MT-30)
David Darling — cello, 8 string electric cello

References

ECM Records albums
Terje Rypdal albums
David Darling (musician) albums
1983 albums
Albums produced by Manfred Eicher